CCDI (Camargo Correa Desenvolvimento Imobiliario) is a Brazilian homebuilding and commercial real estate development company. It is part of the Camargo Corrêa Group, one of the largest economic conglomerates in Brazil.

The company went public in 01/31/07 and was traded at the Bovespa's Novo Mercado under the ticker symbol CCIM3 in 2012 the company was delisted.

The company has many Brazilian competitors such as PDG, Cyrela Brazil Realty, MRV Engenharia, Even, Rossi Residencial, Brookfield Incorporações, EZ Tec and many others.

External links
 CCDI homepage

Mover Participações
Real estate companies of Brazil